Malus ioensis, known as the Iowa crab or prairie crabapple, is a species of crabapple tree native to the United States. The most common variety, M. ioensis var. ioensis, is found primarily in the prairie regions of the upper Mississippi Valley. Another variety, M. ioensis var. texana, or the Texas crabapple, is found only in a small region of central Texas.

The Iowa crab can grow up to 10 meters (35 feet) in height. It bears white or pink flowers in the summer and small apple-like berries in the fall.

Various wildlife consume the fruit.

References

ioensis
Crabapples
Endemic flora of the United States
Flora of the North-Central United States
Flora of the United States
Flora of the South-Central United States
Fruits originating in North America
Plants described in 1861
Flora without expected TNC conservation status